Verbt or Verb ( or Verbi) is a fire and wind god in Albanian pagan mythology. By controlling the wind he is able to fan the flames of fire and move water, the opposite element to fire. Also known as Shën Verbti or Rmoria, he was worshiped in northern Albania until recent times.

The purifying power of fire underlies the popular idea according to which this deity is the enemy of uncleanliness and the opponent of filth. A reconstructed name of an Albanian fire god is *Enji, from which the Albanian word enjte "thursday" is considered to be derived. In Albanian mythology, Verbti is the counterpart of the weather and storm god Shurdh.

Etymology
The name Verbti appears to be connected with the Albanian term i verbër meaning "the blind one", however this link seems to be only a coincidence, since according to folk beliefs he can actually see very well. The name Verbt / Verb must be related to vorbull and the variant vorbëtinë, "whirlpool, -wind, vortex, swirl", probably derived from Proto-Albanian *uērb-, from Proto-Indo-European *uer-b-, "to revolve, twist, turn (down)".

Folk beliefs
According to folk beliefs, Verbti is the god who controls fire and wind. By controlling the wind he is able to fan the flames of fire and move water, the opposite element to fire. He is said to have saved a boy from drowning after the people prayed to him. Verbti performed the rescue by controlling the northern wind, which raised the water in billow, and the waves thus created threw the boy out of the water alive. Verbti is described as a deity who hates uncleanliness and bad ways of speaking and he will punish anyone who speaks badly of him. The purifying power of fire underlies the popular idea according to which this deity is the enemy of uncleanliness and the opponent of filth.

With the coming of Christianity in Albania, Verbti was demonized and considered a false god, and it was spread about that anyone who invoked him would go blind. However, in folk beliefs the god Verbti was often considered more powerful than the Christian God. The struggle between the old and the new god and the predominant popularity of Verbti in Albanian folk beliefs is expressed in a tale narrated from a Christian point of view,  according to which two lads met together, then one said: "Let me pray to Verbi! Afterwards we will go to fight on!" The other, however, replied to him: "Verbti, there's no such thing! But the God in heaven, who is only one, he is the true God!" So one prayed to Verbti and the other to the true God. Then they fought against each other. But God arranged it so that the one who prayed to the true God was killed, while the other who prayed to Verbi survived. Hence all the people placed their hopes in Verbti.

See also

Albanian mythology
Drangue
En (deity)
Nëna e Vatrës
Stihi
Ljubi
Zojz (deity)
Perëndi
Shurdh

Sources

Citations

Bibliography

Albanian mythology
Fire gods
Water gods
Wind gods